Mojsije is a Serbian name, derived from Greek Mōÿsēs (Mωϋσῆς), a variant of the biblical name Moses. It may refer to:

Mojsije I Rajović, Serbian Orthodox Patriarch 1712-1725
Mojsije Putnik, Serbian Orthodox Metropolitan of Sremski Karlovci 1781-1790
Mojsije Margel, Croatian rabbi
Mojsije Dečanac, Serbian Orthodox monk and printer

See also
Musa (name)

Serbian masculine given names